John Katzenbach (born June 23, 1950) is an American author of popular fiction.  Son of Nicholas Katzenbach, former United States Attorney General, Katzenbach worked as a criminal court reporter for the Miami Herald and Miami News, and a featured writer for the Herald's Tropic magazine.  He is married to Madeleine Blais and they live in western Massachusetts.

He left the newspaper industry to write psychological thrillers.  His first, 1982's In the Heat of the Summer, was nominated for an Edgar Award and then became the movie The Mean Season, filmed partially in The Herald's newsroom and starring Kurt Russell and Mariel Hemingway.

Two more of his books were made into films in the United States, 1995's Just Cause with Sean Connery and 2002's Hart's War with Bruce Willis. A fourth book, The Wrong Man, was made in 2011 as the French TV film Faux Coupable.

Bibliography
In the Heat of the Summer (1982; Edgar Award nominee for best first novel) Translation: Katzenbach, J, (1982), Al calor del verano, Barcelona, España, Ediciones B, Escoms, N, 1ª edición: Julio 2014
First Born (1984) 
The Traveler (1987) Translation: Katzenbach, J, (1987), Retrato en sangre, Barcelona, España, Ediciones B, Martín, C, 1ª ed. Julio 2014
Day of Reckoning (1989) Translation: Katzenbach, J, (1989), Un asunto pendiente, Barcelona, España, Suma de letras, Vidal, L, 1ª ed. 2011
Just Cause (1992) Translation: Katzenbach, J, (1992), Juicio final, Barcelona, España, Ediciones B, Alonso, M y Iglesias, B, 1ª ed. Julio 2014
The Shadow Man (1995; Edgar nominee) Translation: Katzenbach, J, (1995), La sombra, Barcelona, España, Ediciones B, Martín, C, Paredes, L y Solà, R, 1ª ed. Septiembre 2010
State of Mind (1997) Translation: Katzenbach, J, (1997), Juegos de ingenio, Barcelona, España, Ediciones B, Abreu, C, 1ª ed. Enero 2011
Hart's War (1999)Translation: Katzenbach, J, (1997), La guerra de Hart, Barcelona, España, Ediciones B, Batlles, C, 1ª ed. Julio 2007
The Analyst (2002) Translation: Katzenbach, J, (2002), El psicoanalista, Barcelona, España, Ediciones B, Paredes, L, 1ª ed. Julio 2010
The Madman's Tale (2004) Translation: Katzenbach, J, (2004), La historia del loco, Barcelona, España, Ediciones B, Paredes, L, 1ª ed. Julio 2014
The Wrong Man (2007) Translation: Katzenbach, J, (2007), El hombre equivocado, Barcelona, España, Ediciones B, Marín, R, 1ª ed. Julio 2014
What Comes Next (2010) Translation: Katzenbach, J, (2010), El profesor, Barcelona, España, Ediciones B, Sierra, J, 1ª ed. Marzo 2015
Red 1-2-3 (2012) Translation: Katzenbach, J, (2012), Un final perfecto, Barcelona, España, Ediciones B, Diago, M y Debritto, A 1ª ed. Noviembre 2012
The Dead Student (2014) Translation: Katzenbach, J, (2014), El estudiante, Barcelona, España, Ediciones B, Paredes, L, 1ª ed. Noviembre 2014
By Persons Unknown (2016) Translation: Katzenbach, J, (2016), Personas desconocidas, Barcelona, España, Ediciones B, Moral, G, 1ª ed. Diciembre 2016
The Analyst II (2018)Translation: Katzenbach, J, (2018), Jaque al psicoanalista, Barcelona, España, Ediciones B, Paredes, L, 1ª ed. Octubre 2019

Filmography
The Mean Season (1985) (based on In the Heat of the Summer)
Just Cause (1995)
Hart's War (2002)

References

External links

Official site

1950 births
Living people
20th-century American novelists
Katzenbach family
American thriller writers
American crime fiction writers
Phillips Exeter Academy alumni
Sidwell Friends School alumni
Novelists from Massachusetts
Novelists from New Jersey
People from Princeton, New Jersey
21st-century American novelists
American male novelists
20th-century American male writers
21st-century American male writers